The Tribunal is a 2017 Nigerian film directed and produced by Kunle Afolayan under the production studio of Golden Effects Pictures.
The movie aimed at raising the unjust discrimination faced by albinos in Africa, starring Bimbo Manuel, Nobert Young, Omotola Jalade-Ekeinde, Caroline King and Funsho Adeolu.

Synopsis 
The movie revolves around an albino who is wrongly sacked by bank because of his physical appearance. He approached a law school graduate who also seek the help of Jimi Disu, a once famous lawyer who has become a charge and Bail attorney. The movie became tensed when Jimi Disu had to battle for his client, his old firm, his friends and the redemption of his law career.

Premiere 
The Tribunal was premiered across cinemas in Nigeria and Ghana on 1 September  2017.

Cast 
Omotola Jalade-Ekeinde, 
Funsho Adeolu, 
Bimbo Manuel,
Norbert Young, 
Carol King, 
Ade Laoye, 
 Damilola Ogunsi.

References 

2017 films
Nigerian drama films